Richard George Clitherow (1909–1984) was the fifth Suffragan Bishop of Stafford. Educated at Dulwich College and Corpus Christi College, Cambridge, he was ordained in 1936 and began his career with a curacy at Bermondsey. When World War II came he became a Naval Chaplain. From 1946 to 1958 he was Canon Residentiary at Guildford Cathedral before ascending to the Episcopate, a post he held until retirement 18 years later.

Notes

1909 births
People educated at Dulwich College
Alumni of Corpus Christi College, Cambridge
Royal Naval Volunteer Reserve personnel of World War II
Bishops of Stafford
1984 deaths
Royal Navy chaplains
World War II chaplains
20th-century Church of England bishops